The year 2008 is the fifth year in the history of the Konfrontacja Sztuk Walki, a mixed martial arts promotion based in Poland. In 2008, Konfrontacja Sztuk Walki held 4 events beginning with, KSW Elimination II.

List of events

KSW Elimination 2

KSW Elimination II was a mixed martial arts event held on March 29, 2008 at the Hala Stulecia in Warsaw, Poland.

Results

KSW IX: Konfrontacja

KSW IX: Konfrontacja was a mixed martial arts event on May 9, 2008 at the Hala Torwar in Warsaw, Poland.

Results

KSW Extra

KSW Extra was a mixed martial arts event held on September 13, 2008 at the Hala Centrum in Dabrowa Górnicza, Poland.

Results

KSW 10: Dekalog

KSW 10: Dekalog was a mixed martial arts event held on December 12, 2008 at the Hala Torwar in Warsaw, Poland.

Results

See also 
 Konfrontacja Sztuk Walki

References

Konfrontacja Sztuk Walki events
2008 in mixed martial arts